The Galt Canadians were a junior ice hockey team based in Galt, Ontario, now a part of the city of Cambridge. They played in the Ontario Hockey Association from 1943 to 1944. Their home arena was the Galt Arena Gardens.

The Canadians had a successful inaugural year in the league, winning 15 of 26 games played. The following year, the team gained sponsorship from the NHL's Detroit Red Wings, and changed their name to the Galt Red Wings.

NHL alumni
From the Galt Canadians, four players graduated to play in the National Hockey League.

 Pete Babando
 Lee Fogolin
 Nels Podolsky
 Barry Sullivan

Yearly results

External links
 www.cambridgehockey.com - The History of Cambridge Hockey by Todd Jones
 Galt Arena Gardens - OHL Arena & Travel Guide

1943 establishments in Ontario
1944 disestablishments in Ontario
Defunct Ontario Hockey League teams
Ice hockey clubs established in 1943
Ice hockey clubs disestablished in 1944
Sport in Cambridge, Ontario